Nikhil Dutta (born 13 October 1994) is a Canadian cricketer. Dutta is right-handed batsman who bowls right-arm off spin. Dutta made his One Day International debut for Canada against Kenya in March 2013. He is the first Bengali to represent a national cricket team apart from India or Bangladesh .

He was originally included in Canada's squad for the 2015 ICC World Twenty20 Qualifier tournament in July 2015, but he chose to stay with the St Kitts and Nevis Patriots in the Caribbean Premier League. He was replaced by Hiral Patel.

T20 leagues 
Dutta played for St Kitts and Nevis Patriots in the 2015 Caribbean Premier League; he played in three matches with his most notable wicket being former-England international Kevin Pietersen.
Later that year, Dutta was signed by the Barisal Bulls, one of the six teams playing in the 2015 Bangladesh Premier League. He played one game, taking 3/18.

On 3 June 2018, he was selected to play for the Toronto Nationals in the players' draft for the inaugural edition of the Global T20 Canada tournament. In June 2019, he was selected to play for the Montreal Tigers franchise team in the 2019 Global T20 Canada tournament. He was added to the New Jersey Stallions for the 2021 Minor League Cricket season.

International career 
Dutta played his only One Day International to date for Canada against Kenya in March 2013. He did not bat, and bowled six overs without taking a wicket.
Dutta declined selection to the Canada national team in 2015 to play domestic T20 Leagues instead. In January 2018, he played in the 2018 ICC World Cricket League Division Two tournament, ending up as Canada's leading bowler, with 11 wickets.

In September 2018, he was named in Canada's squad for the 2018–19 ICC World Twenty20 Americas Qualifier tournament. In October 2018, he was named in Canada's squad for the 2018–19 Regional Super50 tournament in the West Indies. In April 2019, he was named in Canada's squad for the 2019 ICC World Cricket League Division Two tournament in Namibia.

In August 2019, he was named in Canada's squad for the Regional Finals of the 2018–19 ICC T20 World Cup Americas Qualifier tournament. He made his Twenty20 International (T20I) debut for Canada against the Cayman Islands on 18 August 2019. In September 2019, he was named in Canada's squad for the 2019 Malaysia Cricket World Cup Challenge League A tournament. In October 2019, he was named in Canada's squad for the 2019 ICC T20 World Cup Qualifier tournament in the United Arab Emirates.

References

External links
 

1994 births
Living people
Canadian cricketers
Canada One Day International cricketers
Canada Twenty20 International cricketers
Sportspeople from Kuwait City
Indian expatriates in Kuwait
Indian emigrants to Canada
Canadian sportspeople of Indian descent
St Kitts and Nevis Patriots cricketers
ICC Americas cricketers